The 1936 Duke Blue Devils football team  was an American football team that represented Duke University as a member of the Southern Conference during the 1936 college football season. In its sixth season under head coach Wallace Wade, the team compiled a 9–1 record (7–0 against conference opponents), won the conference championship, and outscored opponents by a total of 208 to 28.  Ace Parker was the team captain. The team played its home games at Duke Stadium in Durham, North Carolina.

Both Clyde Berryman and James Howell named Duke as a retroactive national champion for 1936.

Schedule

References

Duke
Duke Blue Devils football seasons
Southern Conference football champion seasons
Duke Blue Devils football